Vrbje is a village and a municipality in Brod-Posavina County, Croatia. There are 2,215 inhabitants, 99% of whom declare themselves Croats (2011 census).

History
The village of Vrbje was first mentioned in 1720. The local Roman Catholic Church of Saint Joseph was mentioned in 1758 at the time when it was still a wooden construction. A new baroque style church was erected in period between 1773 and 1789 and its most recent reconstruction took place in 1985 during the time of the Socialist Republic of Croatia.

References

Municipalities of Croatia
Populated places in Brod-Posavina County
Slavonia